Federico Pellegrino (born 1 September 1990) is an Italian cross-country skier. Pellegrino is a world champion and Olympic silver medalist in cross-country skiing. In the 2015/2016 season, he won the sprint cup.

Pellegrino is an athlete of the G.S. Fiamme Oro.

Biography
Originally from Nus, Pellegrino made his World Cup debut in the 2009–10 season.  He has achieved his best results in the sprint events and won the Sprint Cup in the 2015–16 season, becoming the first non-Scandinavian to win the Sprint World Cup. As of 30 November 2018 Pellegrino has won 12 individual World Cup victories, all of them sprints: he holds the record for most individual wins for an Italian in the Cross-Country World Cup. He won his first international medal in cross-country skiing at the 2015 World Championships in Falun, Sweden. Together with Dietmar Nöckler, Pellegrino won a bronze medal on Team sprint, classic. In 2017 he became World Champion after winning the sprint freestyle event during the 2017 World Championships in Lahti, Finland. This was the first gold medal for the Italian men at the Nordic Worlds since Renato Pasini and Cristian Zorzi won the team sprint in 2007. He was a part of the Italian team which won the nation's second consecutive medal on the team sprint event, this time a silver medal together with teammate Dietmar Nöckler.

He is the cousin of the mountain running champion Xavier Chevrier. Pellegrino has been in a relationship with fellow cross-country skier Greta Laurent since 2012, having previously been a couple during their school-age careers. He dedicated his first World Cup race win in 2014 to Laurent. Since 2012 they have lived in Gressoney-Saint-Jean.

Cross-country skiing results
All results are sourced from the International Ski Federation (FIS).

Olympic Games
 2 medals – (2 silver)

Distance reduced to 30 km due to weather conditions.

World Championships
 6 medals – (1 gold, 3 silver, 2 bronze)

World Cup

Season titles
 2 titles – (2 sprint)

Season standings

Individual podiums
 17 victories – (12 , 5 ) 
 42 podiums – (25 , 17 )

Team podiums
 4 victories – (1 , 3 ) 
 9 podiums – (2 , 7 )

References

External links
 

1990 births
Cross-country skiers at the 2014 Winter Olympics
Cross-country skiers at the 2018 Winter Olympics
Cross-country skiers at the 2022 Winter Olympics
Living people
Olympic cross-country skiers of Italy
Italian male cross-country skiers
FIS Nordic World Ski Championships medalists in cross-country skiing
People from Aosta
Medalists at the 2018 Winter Olympics
Medalists at the 2022 Winter Olympics
Olympic silver medalists for Italy
Olympic medalists in cross-country skiing
Tour de Ski skiers
Sportspeople from Aosta Valley
Cross-country skiers of Fiamme Oro